For the 2011/12 season the Slough Jets franchise are entering a team in the EPIHL, ENL League 1 and the ENL League 2. This follows on from the ENL team's successful inaugural year in the ENL League 2, in which they gained promotion as league champions.

For their first season in ENL League 1, the Slough Jets ENL will be renewing rivalries with old foes, Romford Raiders, Chelmsford Chieteins and the IOW Raiders

Slough Jets ENL League 1

Slough Jets head coach Doug Shepperd announced that 2 players signed to the Slough Jets ENL team for the 2011/12 will be playing up to the EPL team. Sam Godfrey and Andrew Melachrino will both be playing and training with the senior team.

Club roster 2011–12

Regular season

League standings

Bold- Qualified for Playoffs

Slough Jets ENL League 2

Following the victorious Slough Jets ENL team last year and their subsequent promotion to ENL League 1, the Slough Jets organisation successfully applied to enter a team in ENL league 2. This is to unable a continuous progression route from the juniors all the way to the Slough Jets EPIHL team.

Club roster 2011–12

Regular season

League standings

References

Slough Jets
Slou